Emili Prats Grau (born 1 June 1946) is an Andorran politician. He is a member of the Liberals of Andorra.

External links
Page at the General Council of the Principality of Andorra

Members of the General Council (Andorra)
1946 births
Living people
Liberal Party of Andorra politicians
Place of birth missing (living people)